Jewish Science is  a Jewish philosophy developed in response and to counterweight the Christian elements of Christian Science and New Thought.

Jewish Science may also refer to:

 , the science of Judaism
 Jewish Physics, a discriminatory term in the Nazi era
 Jewish Science, the secular scholarship of some Jews in the Middle Ages